...---... is the seventh album by the Swedish heavy metal band Morgana Lefay, released 21 March 2000.

Reception 
In 2005, ...---... was ranked number 417 in Rock Hard magazine's book of The 500 Greatest Rock & Metal Albums of All Time.

Track listing 
"Save Our Souls" – 4:36
"Cimmerian Dream" – 4:57
"Sleepwalker" – 4:52
"Epicedium" – 6:01
"When Gargoyles Fly" – 4:32
"What Dreams Forbode" – 5:05
"Bloodred Sky" – 6:04
"Help Me Out of Here" – 4:55
"The Quest for Reality" – 3:44
"The Choice" – 7:47

Personnel 
 Charles Rytkönen – vocals
 Tony Eriksson – guitars
 Peter Grehn – guitars
 Micke Åsentorp – bass
 Robin Engström – drums

References 

2000 albums
Morgana Lefay albums
Albums with cover art by Kristian Wåhlin
Noise Records albums